The Mbabane River is a river of Eswatini. It flows through Hhohho District in the north-west of the country. The city of Mbabane is located along the river. Tributaries include the Polinjane River.

See also
 Geography of Eswatini

Rivers of Eswatini

References